A pastry heart is a regional dessert item found in the Western New York area, with Buffalo credited as the place it was first created.

The pastry heart is a heart shaped flaky puff pastry, similar to a palmier or palm leaves pastry, that is usually topped with a white sugar icing that has a hard shell but is soft on the inside.

See also
Buffalo wings
Garbage plate
Grape pie
Loganberry drink
Texas hots

References

Culture of Buffalo, New York
Cuisine of New York (state)
Pastries
Cuisine of the Mid-Atlantic states